The Magyar Autonomous Region (1952–1960) (Romanian: Regiunea Autonomă Maghiară, Hungarian: Magyar Autonóm Tartomány) and Mureș-Magyar Autonomous Region (1960–1968) were autonomous regions in the Romanian People's Republic (later the Socialist Republic of Romania).

History 
In 1950, Romania adopted a Soviet-style administrative and territorial division of the country into regions and raions (until then, Romania had been divided into județe or counties).

Two years later, in 1952, under Soviet pressure, the number of regions was reduced and by comprising ten raions from the former Mureș Region and from the Stalin Region (both of them created in 1950), of the territory inhabited by a compact population of Székely Hungarians, a new region called the Magyar Autonomous Region was created.  According to the 1956 census, the total population of the region was 731,361, distributed among the ethnic groups as follows: Hungarians (77.3%), Romanians (20.1%), Roma (1.5%), Germans (0.4%) and Jews (0.4%). The official languages of the province were Hungarian and Romanian and the provincial administrative centre was Târgu Mureș (Marosvásárhely).

Its status laid out in the 1952 Constitution, the region encompassed about a third of Romania's Hungarians, the rest living either in more Romanian areas or along the border with Hungary, where an ethnic-based region might have stoked fears of irredentism and security concerns. In practice, the region's status differed in no way from that of the other seventeen regions and it did not enjoy autonomy of any kind – laws, decisions and directives from the centre were rendered compulsory by the very constitution that created it, and the State Council of the Autonomous Region was merely a façade. The Region's only distinguishing features were that most of its officials were Hungarian, the Hungarian language could be used in administration and the courts, and bilingual signs were put up on public buildings. Moreover, the specifically Hungarian wing of the Romanian Communist Party was abolished in 1953, ending any mechanism for defending of the Hungarian minority's collective rights.

In December 1960, a governmental decree modified the boundaries of the Magyar Autonomous Region. Its southern raions were reattached to Brașov Region (former Stalin Region) and in place of this, several raions were joined to it from Cluj Region. The region was called the Mureș Region-Magyar Autonomous, after the Mureș River. The ratio of Hungarians was thus reduced from 77.3% to 62%.

In 1968, the Great National Assembly put an end to the soviet style administrative division of the country into regions and re-introduced the historical judeţ (county) system, still used today. This also automatically eliminated the Mureș-Magyar Autonomous Region and replaced it with counties that are not identified with any nationality. The two new counties formed on the majority of the territory of former Mureș-Magyar Autonomous Region are Mureș County and Harghita County, plus one from the former Magyar Autonomous Region until 1960 and part of the Brașov Region in 1968, Covasna County.

In two of these counties, Harghita and Covasna, Hungarians form the majority of inhabitants. The Romanian law enables the usage of the language of an ethnic minority which forms at least 20% of the population of a municipality in relation with the administration, and the state provides education and public signage in the language of the respective ethnic minority.

Neighbors 
 Magyar Autonomous Region had as neighbors (1952–1960):
East: Bacău Region and Bârlad Region;  
South: Stalin Region and Ploiești Region; 
West: Cluj Region; 
North: Suceava Region.

 Mureș Region-Magyar Autonomous had as neighbors (1960–1968):
East: Bacău Region; 
South: Brașov Region;  
West: Cluj Region;  
North: Suceava Region.

See also 
 Hungarians in Romania
 Székelys
 Székely Land
 Csángó Land
 Partium
 Ethnic clashes of Târgu Mureș
 Northern Transylvania
 Transylvania

Notes

a. Also informal referred to in some publications as Hungarian Autonomous Region or Mureș-Hungarian Autonomous Region

References

External links 

 Maps
 Republica Populară Română, Structura Administrativ-Teritorală (1952) ("Romanian People's Republic, Administrative-Territorial Structure (1952)"), a map showing the Magyar Autonomous Region ("Regiunea Autonomă Maghiara").

Regions of the People's Republic of Romania
Székelys
20th century in Transylvania
States and territories established in 1952
States and territories disestablished in 1968